Santa Cruz Norte is a mountain in the Cordillera Blanca in the Andes of Peru; within Santa Cruz District, Huaylas Province, Ancash.

References 

Five-thousanders of the Andes
Mountains of Ancash Region